Kishapu District is one of the three districts of the Shinyanga Region of Tanzania.  It is bordered to the north by the Maswa District, to the south by the Tabora Region, to the east by the Meatu District and to the west by the Shinyanga Rural and Urban Districts.

The open pit Williamson diamond mine (also known as Mwadui mine) is located in Kishapu District.

According to the 2002 Tanzania National Census, the population of Kishapu District was 240,086.

Wards 

Kishapu District is administratively divided into 20 wards:

 Bubiki
 Bunambiyu
 Itilima
 Kiloleli
 Kishapu
 Lagana
 Masanga
 Mondo
 Mwadui Luhumbo
 Mwakipoya
 Mwamalasa
 Mwamashele
 Ngofila
 Seke Bugoro
 Shagihilu
 Somagedi
 Songwa
 Talaga
 Uchunga
 Ukenyenge
mwataga

References

Sources
 Kishapu District Homepage for the 2002 Tanzania National Census

Districts of Shinyanga Region